Pekmezli can refer to:

 Pekmezli, Biga
 Pekmezli, Erzincan
 Pekmezli, Tufanbeyli